"Sympathy for the Devil" is a song by the Rolling Stones

Sympathy for the Devil may also refer to:
Sympathy for the Devil (1968 film), a film by Jean-Luc Godard
Sympathy for the Devil (2019 film), a film by Guillaume de Fontenay
Sympathy for the Devil (2023 film), directed by Yuval Adler
Sympathy for the Devil (album), an album by Laibach
Sympathy for the Devil (audio drama), based on the television series Doctor Who
Sympathy for the Devil, a novel by Holly Lisle

Television
"Sympathy for the Devil" (Grey's Anatomy), an episode of Grey's Anatomy
 "Sympathy for the Devil" (Supernatural), an episode of Supernatural
"Sympathy for the Devil", an episode of Battle Creek
"Sympathy for the Devil", an episode of Cowboy Bebop
"Sympathy for the Devil", an episode of Instant Star
"Sympathy for the Devil", an episode of One Tree Hill
"Sympathy for the Devil", an episode of Rizzoli & Isles
"Sympathy for the Devil", an episode of Touched by an Angel
"Sympathy for the Devil", an episode of Witch Hunter Robin

See also
"Sympathy for the De Vil", an episode of Once Upon a Time